Zoltán Berkes (1 October 1916 – 16 April 1996) was a Hungarian field hockey player who competed in the 1936 Summer Olympics.

In 1936 he was a member of the Hungarian team which was eliminated in the group stage of the Olympic tournament. He played one match as forward.

External links
 
Zoltán Berkes' profile at Sports Reference.com
Zoltán Berkes' profile at the Hungarian Olympic Committee 

1916 births
1996 deaths
Hungarian male field hockey players
Olympic field hockey players of Hungary
Field hockey players at the 1936 Summer Olympics
Sportspeople from Hilversum